London Steiner School (formerly Waldorf School of South West London) is a Steiner Education-based independent school located at 9 Weir Road in Balham, the London Borough of Lambeth, England.

History
The Waldorf School of South West London opened in September 1983, with one student and one teacher.  For more than 30 years, the school has provided Steiner Waldorf education in South London.

The school was situated on Tooting Common, on public land rented from Wandsworth Council until 2010. The original wooden buildings burned to the ground in 2004 (suspected arson) and the school relocated temporarily to a church hall in Streatham while a new building was erected on the original site. Four years after the school moved into the new building, the council decided not to renew the lease, and the school looked for new permanent premises.

The school moved temporarily back into the Church Hall in Streatham for a further two years, before the present site of 9 Weir Road in Balham was found.

The school is now using the trading name of London Steiner School.

Admissions
The Waldorf School of South West London (now London Steiner School) provides Waldorf Steiner education for children aged 3 to 14 (early years/kindergarten to Class 8). When grade 8 is completed, students move on to their next school, which could be any secondary school in the country, Steiner or otherwise. Plans for opening an upper school have been considered, but are not currently being acted on, mainly due to funding. The school provides indoor and outdoor Parent and Child Groups (0–3 years old).

See also
 Curriculum of the Waldorf schools

External links
 Official website
 Fire on 26 June 2004

1983 establishments in England
Balham
Educational institutions established in 1983
Private co-educational schools in London
Private schools in the London Borough of Lambeth
School buildings in the United Kingdom destroyed by arson
Waldorf schools in the United Kingdom